Wallasey Village is a district of the town of Wallasey, within the Metropolitan Borough of Wirral in England. Localities within this area are informally said to be in "The Village". At the 2001 Census the population of the district was 8,550.

Wallasey Village is the most westerly township in Wallasey, being bordered by the Wallasey suburbs of New Brighton to the north east, Liscard to the east and Poulton to the south east. Further west is Leasowe, and to the north, beyond Harrison Park, is the King's Parade fronting Liverpool Bay. The Wirral Show used to be held on the extensive grassed areas - known as "the Dips" along this promenade, to the west of New Brighton.

History

St Hilary’s Church may date back to the earliest days of Christianity in Britain. There are just eight churches in Britain named after the Bishop of Poitiers, St. Hilary, who contributed to the First Council of Nicaea in 325 AD, and it is thought that they were founded by St Germanus, who was invited from France as a missionary by the 5th century English church. The tower is all that remains of a later church, which was built in 1530 but destroyed by fire in 1857: by the time someone had raced to Birkenhead to alert the fire brigade, and they had harnessed the horses to the fire tenders and galloped back to Wallasey, little remained of the church apart from a charred shell and the tower.

Until about the 15th century, the village was generally known as Kirkby in Walley.  his derives from the Norse words meaning "village with a church", and Walea, the Anglo-Saxon name for Wallasey as recorded in the Domesday Book. The village of West Kirby (or Kirkby) was so named to differentiate it from this Kirkby.

On 24 December 2022, a gunman killed a woman and injured four men in a mass shooting at a pub.

Geography
Wallasey Village is situated in the north-east of the Wirral Peninsula, adjoining the Irish Sea to the north-west of the village.

Community

Wallasey Village is a largely residential area with various shops and pubs along the central road, Wallasey Village (road), with some extending along the eastern end of Leasowe Road.

Wallasey Village forms part of Metropolitan Borough of Wirral's Wallasey ward and is represented by Conservative Party Councillors: Lesley Rennie, Paul Hayes and Ian Lewis. The most recent local elections took place on 5 May 2016, when Ian Lewis was elected by 50% of the votes cast and a majority of 675.

Transport

There are two railway stations within this area: Wallasey Village and Wallasey Grove Road. Both are well-used despite their close proximity (approx 0.5 miles): this is mainly because Wallasey Grove Road Station has a large free car park for travellers wishing to park and ride and excellent ground level access whereas Wallasey Village Station connects with the major bus routes which run along Leasowe Road where it is situated.

References

External links

History of Wallasey
Wallasey - Village Of Yesteryear (movie montage of Victorian and Edwardian images)

Towns and villages in the Metropolitan Borough of Wirral
Wallasey